Nepalko Balinali ra Tinko Digo Kheti is an agricultural book by Nar Bahadur Saud. It was published in 2010 by Sajha Publications and won the Madan Puraskar, 2066 BS.

Background 
Saud was paralyzed from the waist down by a road accident two decades ago. Wheel-chair bound, he had been working on the book for the last 10 years. He graduated in agriculture from Palampur in India and started work as an officer in the National Agriculture Research Council. Before the accident, he was working as a Technical Officer of Dairy Development Corporation (Nepal).

Awards 
The book won the Madan Puraskar for 2066 BS. This was the first time in the past 50 years that a book on agriculture was awarded with Madan Puraskar. Before this, Uddyan (garden) written by Gangabikram Sijapati was awarded Madan Puraskar in 2015 BS (1958).

See also 
 Hamro Lok Sanskriti
 Makaiko Kheti
 Limbuwanko Etihasik Dastavej Sangraha

References 

Madan Puraskar-winning works
Nepalese books
Nepalese non-fiction books
Nepali-language books
2010 non-fiction books
Agriculture books